No Place Like Brooklyn (stylized as No Place Like BKLYN) is the first album recorded by the singer Jeannie Ortega, released by Hollywood Records on August 1, 2006. The album includes the singles "It's R Time" and "Crowded". "No Place Like BKLYN" is Jeannie's only album from Hollywood Records. She was eventually dropped by Hollywood Records in 2007. Jeannie eventually released her Christian albums "Perfect Love" and "Love Changed Me" through AIC Records. "Perfect Love" was released on January 30, 2012. Four years later "Love Changed Me" was released on November 1, 2016.

Track listing 
Explicit / Clean 
 "Crowded" (featuring Papoose) (J. Ortega/Mikkel SE/T. Hernansen/W. Mackie) – 3:07
 "Pay It" (featuring Kovas) (J. Ortega/J. Roston/K. Childs/K. Myvett) – 3:23
 "Green I'z"  (J. Ortega/K. Myvett) – 3:26
 "Can U?" (featuring Quan) (A. Wilson/C. Peacock/D. Howard/D. Katz/L. Gottwald/T. Jamon) – 3:18
 "So Done"  (A. Cantrall/D. Shape/J. Ortega/Karlin/Soulshock) – 3:18
 "Let It Go"  (B. Kierulf/J. Ortega/J. Schwatz) – 4:00
 "What I Need"  (B. Kierulf/J. Ortega/J. Schwatz) – 3:37
 "It's R Time"  (featuring Gemstar, N.O.R.E., Big Mato) (Bigmato/Gemstar-N-Bigmato/J. Ortega/Kyze/N.O.R.E./SPK) – 4:59
 "Bling"  (J. Ortega/J. Roston/M. Leathers/S. Campbell) – 3:00
 "Hear Me"  (A. Simmons/J. Ortega/K. Myvett) – 3:46
 "Don't Stop"  (J. Ortega/J. Williams/L. Simmons/R. Cham) – 3:42

Bonus tracks:
 CD edition
12. "Crowded" (Spanglish) (featuring Papoose) – 3:12

 Digital download edition
12. "So Done (Remix)" (featuring Papoose) – 4:10

Charts

Singles
2005 "It's R Time" (October 5, 2005)
2006 "Crowded" (February 21, 2006)
2006 "So Done"

References

External links 
 Jeannie Ortega at AIC Records

2006 debut albums
Albums produced by Danja (record producer)
Albums produced by Dr. Luke
Albums produced by Stargate
Hollywood Records albums
Albums produced by Soulshock and Karlin